A salient (also known as a panhandle or bootheel) is an elongated protrusion of a geopolitical entity, such as a subnational entity or a sovereign state.

While similar to a peninsula in shape, a salient is most often not surrounded by water on three sides. Instead, it has a land border on at least two sides and extends from the larger geographical body of the administrative unit.

In American English, the term panhandle is often used to describe a relatively long and narrow salient, such as the westernmost extensions of Florida and Oklahoma. Another term is bootheel, used for the Missouri Bootheel and New Mexico Bootheel areas.

Origin
The term salient is derived from military salients. The term "panhandle" derives from the analogous part of a cooking pan, and its use is generally confined to North America.

The salient shape can be the result of arbitrarily drawn international or subnational boundaries, though the location of administrative borders can also take into account other considerations such as economic ties or topography.

Country-level salients

Africa

Cibitoke Province, Burundi
Far North Region, Cameroon
Congo Pedicle, Democratic Republic of the Congo
Kongo Central, Democratic Republic of the Congo
Southern Red Sea Region, Eritrea
Gambela Region, Ethiopia
Somali Region, Ethiopia
Nimba County, Liberia
Nsanje District, Malawi
Kayes Region, Mali
Azawad, Mali
Tete Province, Mozambique
Caprivi Strip, Namibia
Casamance, Senegal
Kalahari Gemsbok National Park, South Africa
Upper Nile, South Sudan
Blue Nile, Sudan
Wadi Halfa Salient, Sudan
Kagera Region, Tanzania

Americas

Misiones, Argentina
Roraima, Brazil
Southern Ontario (particularly Ontario Peninsula), Canada
Tatshenshini-Alsek Park, British Columbia, Canada
Leticia and Puerto Nariño municipalities, Amazonas, Colombia
Southeast Guainía Department, Colombia
Yavaraté, Vaupés Department, Colombia
Petén Department, Guatemala
Tumbes Region, Peru
Southeast Alaska, Alaska, United States (see also Panhandles in the United States)
Amazonas, Venezuela

Asia

Wakhan Corridor, Afghanistan
Chittagong, Bangladesh
Rangpur, Bangladesh
Tanintharyi Region, Burma (Myanmar)
Parrot's Beak, Cambodia
Yadong County (Tibet Autonomous Region), China
Louroujina Salient, Cyprus
Seven Sister States, India (largest in the world)
Sikkim, India
Jerusalem corridor, Israel
Galilee Panhandle, Israel
Mafraq Governorate, Jordan
Mangystau Region, Kazakhstan
Batken, Kyrgyzstan 
Phongsaly Province, Laos 
Tfail Salient, Lebanon
North Hamgyŏng, South Hamgyŏng, and Ryanggang, North Korea
Primorsky Krai, Russia
Sughd, Tajikistan
Southern Thailand, Thailand
Aralık, Iğdır Province, Turkey
Hatay Province, Turkey
Jizzakh Region, Sirdaryo Region, Tashkent Region, Tashkent City, Namagan, Fergana and Andijan Regions, Uzbekistan
Surxondaryo Region, Uzbekistan
Tây Ninh Province, Vietnam

Europe

Syunik, Armenia
Tyrol and Vorarlberg, Austria
West Flanders, Belgium
Neum, Bosnia and Herzegovina
Vidin Province, Bulgaria
Dubrovnik-Neretva County, Croatia
Ilok, Croatia
Cheb District, Czech Republic
Šluknov Hook, Czech Republic
Laatre, Viljandi County, Estonia
Enontekiö, Finland
Charleville-Mézières, France
Kakheti, Georgia
Western Thrace, Greece
Donegal, Ireland
Monaghan, Ireland
Province of Trieste, Italy
Dieveniškės appendix, Lithuania
Castelré, North Brabant, the Netherlands
Limburg, the Netherlands
County Fermanagh, United Kingdom
Pasvikdalen valley, Norway
Bogatynia, Poland
Odessa Oblast, Ukraine
Melgaço and north of Monção and Arcos de Valdevez (Viana do Castelo District), Portugal
 Tourém in north of Montalegre (Vila Real District), Portugal
Couto Misto in north of Montalegre (Vila Real District), Portugal
Miranda do Douro, Mogadouro and Vimioso (Bragança District), Portugal
Moura and eastern Barrancos (Beja District) and Mourão (Évora District), Portugal
Olivenza claim of Portugal in Spain
Bryansk Oblast, Russia
Ain, France (around the border of Switzerland)
Galicia, Spain
Canton of Geneva, Switzerland
Canton of Schaffhausen, Switzerland
Bernina, Inn, Lugano, Mendrisio and Porrentruy Districts, Switzerland
Budjak, Ukraine
Jamena, Serbia
Petsamo, formerly Finland

Subnational salients 
The following locations are salients in First-level administrative subdivisions of nations.

Subnational salients in Africa

Tafraoui, Oran Province, Algeria
Southwestern Saïda Province, Algeria
Northeastern Bié Province, Angola
Eastern Kgalagadi District, Botswana
Balé Province, Boucle du Mouhoun Region, Burkina Faso
Kouritenga Province, Centre-Est Region, Burkina Faso
Northwest Bujumbura Rural Province, Burundi
Northern Muyinga Province, Burundi
Okoyo District, Cuvette Department, Republic of the Congo
Kimongo District, Niari Department, Republic of the Congo
Northwestern Wele-Nzas Province, Equatorial Guinea
Sitti Zone, Somali Region, Ethiopia
Haut-Komo Department, Woleu-Ntem Province, Gabon
Upper Denkyira West District, Central Region, Ghana
Télimélé Prefecture, Kindia Region, Guinea
Northeast Mamou Prefecture, Mamou Region, Guinea
Western Isiolo County, Kenya
Eastern Al Wahat District, Libya
Southern Mzimba District, Northern Region, Malawi
Eastern Dakhlet Nouadhibou Region, Mauritania
Boumdeid Department, Assaba Region, Mauritania
Southeastern Tete Province, Mozambique
Gossas Department, Fatick Region, Senegal
Southern Uvinza District, Kigoma Region, Tanzania
Babati, Hanang, and Mbulu Districts, Manyara Region, Tanzania
Gokwe North and Gokwe South Districts, Midlands Province, Zimbabwe

Subnational salients in the Americas

Southern Buenos Aires Province, Argentina
Luis Calvo, Chuquisaca Department, Bolivia
Sud Cinti, Chuquisaca Department, Bolivia
Whale Coast, Bahia, Brazil
Northern Mato Grosso, Brazil
Triângulo Mineiro, Minas Gerais, Brazil
Middle Côte-Nord, Quebec, Canada
Northwestern British Columbia, Canada
Arauco Province, Bío Bío Region, Chile
San Antonio Province, Valparaíso Region, Chile
Urabá region, Antioquia Department, Colombia
Unguía and Acandí in northernmost Chocó Department, Colombia
Santander Department northern tip, Colombia
Santa Rosa and Piamonte in southeastern Cauca Department, Colombia
Western Puntarenas Province, Costa Rica
Guamá, Santiago de Cuba Province, Cuba
Southern Hato Mayor Province, Dominican Republic
Southern Samaná Province, Dominican Republic
Cotacachi Canton, Imbabura Province, Ecuador
Southeastern Napo Province, Ecuador
Balzar and El Empalme Cantons, Guayas Province, Ecuador
Southern San Miguel Department, El Salvador
Northern East Berbice-Corentyne, Guyana
Norte, Jalisco, Mexico
Eastern Tabasco, Mexico
Southeastern Zacatecas, Mexico
Southern Zacatecas, Mexico
Chiriquí Grande District, Bocas del Toro Province, Panama
Southern Chimán District, Panamá Province, Panama
Mariato District, Veraguas Province, Panama
Northern Tapanahony, Sipaliwini District, Suriname
Páez, Apure, Venezuela
Western Andrés Eloy Blanco Municipality, Barinas, Venezuela
Arismendi Municipality, Barinas, Venezuela

Panhandles in the United States

Subnational salients in Asia

Wakhan District, Badakhshan Province, Afghanistan
Nawa District, Ghazni Province, Afghanistan
Chishti Sharif District, Herat Province, Afghanistan
Eastern Sarpang District, Bhutan
Northern Mandalay Division, Burma
Tianchang, Anhui, China PR
Maqu County, Gansu, China PR
Fan County and Taiqian County, Henan, China PR
Pingliang and Qingyang, Gansu, China PR
Daxing'anling Prefecture, Heilongjiang, China PR
Zhaotong, Yunnan, China PR
Koraput and Malkangiri districts, Odisha, India
Pathankot district, Punjab, India
Kota division, Rajasthan, India
Southern Jhansi division, Uttar Pradesh, India
Eastern salient of Java, East Java, Indonesia
South Jakarta, Jakarta Special Capital Region, and Depok, West Java, Indonesia.
Tabalong Regency, South Kalimantan, Indonesia
East Luwu Regency, South Sulawesi, Indonesia
Pasaman Regency, West Sumatra, Indonesia
Semirom County, Isfahan Province, Iran
Southwest Razavi Khorasan Province, Iran
Southern Yazd Province, Iran
Noda, Chiba, Japan
Nose, Osaka, Japan
Ōra District, Gunma, Japan
(Wakasa), Fukui, Japan
Wadi Araba Department, Aqaba Governorate, Jordan
Russeifa Department, Zarqa Governorate, Jordan
Southwest Panfilov District, Chuy Region, Kyrgyzstan
Chong-Alay District, Osh Region, Kyrgyzstan
Nabatieh District, Nabatieh Governorate, Lebanon
The area North of Kuantan, Eastern Pahang, Malaysia
Eastern Achham District, Far-Western Region, Nepal
Western Surkhet District, Mid-Western Region, Nepal
Bannu, Karak, and Kohat Divisions, Khyber Pakhtunkhwa, Pakistan
Eastern Maguindanao, Philippines
Sultan Kudarat, Philippines
Cabuyao, Laguna, Philippines
Cainta, Rizal
Makati, Philippines
Bikinsky District, Khabarovsk Krai, Russia
Trincomalee District, Eastern Province, Sri Lanka
Al-Suqaylabiyah District, Hama Governorate, Syria
Chenggong and Changbin townships, Taitung County, Taiwan
Darvoz District, Gorno-Badakhshan Autonomous Region, Tajikistan
Western Dhamar Governorate, Yemen

Subnational salients in Europe

Southern Gmunden, Upper Austria, Austria
Kuhmoinen, Pirkanmaa, Finland
Parikkala, South Karelia, Finland
Pudasjärvi-Taivalkoski-Kuusamo, North Ostrobothnia, Finland
Ruokolahti, South Karelia, Finland
Varkaus, Pohjois-Savo, Finland
Gironde, France (panhandle is around the Gironde estuary)
Drôme, France (Montfroc)
Hauts-de-Seine, France
Meurthe-et-Moselle, France
Manche, France
Lower Franconia, Bavaria, Germany
Osnabrück District and City, Lower Saxony, Germany
Altenburger Land, Thuringia, Germany
Southeastern Győr-Moson-Sopron County, Hungary
Northern Pest County, Hungary
Clonlisk, County Offaly, Ireland
Tullyhaw, County Cavan, Ireland
Province of Rieti, Lazio, Italy
Raseiniai District Municipality, Kaunas County, Lithuania
Rivierenland, Gelderland, the Netherlands
Steenwijkerland, Overijssel, the Netherlands
Viken, Norway
Mourão, Évora District, Portugal
Vorkuta District, Komi Republic, Russia
Negueira de Muñiz, Galicia (Spain), Spain
Aranjuez, Madrid (Spain), Spain
A Mezquita, Galicia, Spain
Diessenhofen, Schlatt bei Diessenhofen, and Basadingen-Schlattingen, Frauenfeld District, Thurgau, Switzerland
Monthey District, Valais, Switzerland
Buckfastleigh, Teignbridge, United Kingdom
Ceiriog Valley, Wrexham County Borough, Wales, United Kingdom
Western New Forest District, Hampshire, United Kingdom
Newmarket, Suffolk, United Kingdom
North Cornwall, Cornwall, United Kingdom
South Staffordshire, Staffordshire, United Kingdom
The area around Tring, Hertfordshire, United Kingdom, which is itself bounded on one side by a salient of Buckinghamshire in the area around Pitstone, Ivinghoe and Dagnall
Ljig, Kolubara District, Serbia
Ljubovija, Mačva District, Serbia
Bosnian-Podrinje Canton Goražde, Federation of Bosnia and Herzegovina, Bosnia and Herzegovina
Petrovo, Republika Srpska, Bosnia and Herzegovina
Ravno, Herzegovina-Neretva Canton, Bosnia and Herzegovina

Subnational salients in Oceania

Northeastern Nadroga-Navosa Province, Western Division, Fiji
Southern Anetan District, Nauru
Rangitaiki River Valley, Bay of Plenty Region, New Zealand
Hunter River Valley, Otago region, New Zealand
Upper Rangitata Valley, Timaru District, New Zealand
Upper Waitaki Valley, Waitaki District, New Zealand
Northeastern West New Britain Province, Papua New Guinea

See also 

Bootheel
Border irregularities of the United States
Border
Chicken's Neck (disambiguation)
Corridor (disambiguation)
Enclave and exclave
Fergana Valley (triple junction of Uzbekistan, Kyrgyzstan and Tajikistan)
Gerrymandering
Political geography
Salients, re-entrants and pockets
The Thumb

Notes

References

Further reading

Political geography
Border-related lists